Brian Peters (born 15 December 1954) is an English folk singer and multi-instrumentalist. He is known particularly for his interpretations of the Child Ballads and his researches in the traditional music of the North-East of England. He is acknowledged as one of England's leading exponents of the Anglo Concertina and melodeon.

He was born in Stockport, Cheshire, England. Peters is best known in the folk clubs of England, but has also taken his performances to festival and concert stages all over the world, often touring in America, Europe and Australia. He has been described in the folk press as "one of British folk music's finest ambassadors".

He has made many recordings, from the concertina-centred Anglophilia to the ballad-themed Songs of Trial and Triumph. He is also the melodeon player heard on the TV cartoon, SpongeBob SquarePants.

Discography
Persistence of Memory
Fools of Fortune 
The Seeds of Time
Squeezing Out Sparks
Sharper than the Thorn 
The Beast in the Box
Lines
Different Tongues
Anglophilia
Songs of Trial and Triumph (Child Ballads arranged by Brian Peters)
Gritstone Serenade PUG CD 08
with other artists
with Gordon Tyrrall:
Clear The Road
The Moving Moon
with Dave Webber, Anni Fentiman, John O'Hagan & John Morris:
The Widow's Uniform (soldier's poems of Rudyard Kipling as set to music by Peter Bellamy)
with Graham Buckley, Bonz & Dave Pope:
The Rocky Mountain Ploughboys (1999)
with Jeff Davis:
Sharp's Appalachian Harvest (2013)
Television
 SpongeBob SquarePants (2002–2009)

References

External links
Brian Peters biography at CD Baby
Brian Peters – official site
Brian Peters: biography; Harbourtown Records (not really a biography)

1954 births
Living people
English folk musicians
English folk singers
English melodeon players
21st-century accordionists
People from Stockport
Concertina players